Jarfjorden is a fjord on Varanger Fjord in Sør-Varanger Municipality in Troms og Finnmark county, Norway.

The fjord inlet is between Oterneset in the west and Rundskjeret in the east. Just inside the entrance is Litle Jarfjorden almost parallel to Jarfjorden on the east side. There are few human settlements up the fjord, such as Lanabukt on the east side, and further south there are the villages of Storbukt and Tårnet. Here the fjord turns almost ninety degrees to the west into the last section to Jarfjordbotn.

When navigating into Jarfjorden, it is advised to travel nearer the west side. The best place to anchor in Jarfjorden is at Lanabukt, where the water is 20 to 24 metres deep, and where a floating wharf is now in place, thanks to the Sea Salmon Fishermen's Association (Sjølaksefiskarlaget) with Sami support. There is a small uninhabited island called Hinnøya in Jarfjorden, close to Lanabukt. King eider and Steller's eider can be seen on Jarfjorden near Lanabukt during the winter.

Small vessels can alternatively anchor off Jarfjordbotn near the head of the fjord, where the depth is up to 22 metres.

Norwegian National Road 886 runs along the south side of the fjord. Norway's oldest bedrock, Jarfjordgneis, migmatitic gneiss, which is 2900 million years old, is located by the fjord. It dates from the Precambrian period.

References

External links
Jarfjorden on Google Maps

Sør-Varanger
Fjords of Troms og Finnmark